Wang Yu-wen (born 29 July 1971) is a Taiwanese actress. She appeared in Tsai Ming-liang's 1992 film Rebels of the Neon God. She then had a starring role in Ang Lee's 1994 film Eat Drink Man Woman.

External links

1971 births
Living people
20th-century Taiwanese actresses
Taiwanese film actresses